Chang Chen (born 14 October 1976) is a Taiwanese actor. He was born in Taipei, Taiwan. His father Chang Kuo-chu and his brother Hans Chang are also actors.

Career
Chang started his film career at a very young age. He was then selected by a Taiwanese film director Edward Yang to be the protagonist of a four-hour-long critically acclaimed film A Brighter Summer Day, which won the Special Jury Prize at the Tokyo International Film Festival.

One of the earliest films Chang acted in was Wong Kar-wai's Happy Together (1997). He rose to fame for his role as  "Dark Cloud" in the 2000 film Crouching Tiger, Hidden Dragon, directed by Ang Lee. He also featured in Wong Kar-wai's 2046 (2004).

Chang then co-starred with Shu Qi in Hou Hsiao-hsien's Three Times (2005), which was nominated for the Palme d'Or at the Cannes Film Festival and won Golden Horse accolades for Best Taiwanese film, among other awards. For his performance in that film, Chang was also nominated for a Best Actor award at the 2005 Golden Horse Awards.

In 2006, Chang was nominated for the Golden Horse Award for Best Actor for his role in The Go Master, a dramatisation of the life of the Go master Wu Qingyuan. The following year, Chang made his Korean debut in Kim Ki-duk's Breath, which was nominated for the Palme d'Or award at the 2007 Cannes Film Festival,

Chang then starred in the historical war epic Red Cliff (2008-2009), portraying the warlord Sun Quan. He was nominated at the Hong Kong Film Awards for Best Supporting Actor. He next starred in the 2012 historical epic The Last Supper directed by Lu Chuan and the 2013 kungfu epic The Grandmaster by Wong Kar-wai.

In 2014, Chang headlined the wuxia film Brotherhood of Blades, which won commercial success and critical acclaim. He earned his third nomination for Best Actor in the Golden Horse Awards.

In 2015, Chang reunited with Three Times director Hou Hsiao-hsien and co-star Shu Qi in The Assassin, which competed at the Cannes Film Festival.

In 2017, Chang played the title character in the action film Mr. Long, which was selected to compete for the Golden Bear in the main competition section of the 67th Berlin International Film Festival. The same year, he returned for the second installment of Brotherhood of Blades film.

In 2021, Chang played Dr. Wellington Yueh in Denis Villeneuve's epic science fiction film Dune. which premiered at the 78th Venice International Film Festival. In the same year, he won the Best Leading Actor award at the 58th Golden Horse Awards for his performance in the mystery film The Soul, which was his first Golden Horse Award after being nominated three times without winning.

In 2022, Chang was invited to be the jury member of the 59th Golden Horse Awards.

Filmography

Film

Television series

As director

Music video appearances

Theater

Discography

Awards and nominations

References

External links

 
 

 

1976 births
Living people
Taiwanese male film actors
Male actors from Taipei
20th-century Taiwanese male actors
21st-century Taiwanese male actors
21st-century Taiwanese male singers